The AfroNubians (also known as Tarig Abubakar & The Afro Nubians) was a world music band based in Toronto. They played newly-composed and traditional pan-African-style music, blended with Latin, reggae, rock sounds.

History
The AfroNubians came together in 1992. The group's founders included Sudanese immigrant Tarig Abubakar (1964-1998) as leader and principal composer, guitarist Adam Solomon, lead guitarist Joe Szilagy (aka Joe Slant), keyboardist Wail Hajelamin, drummer Kofi Acka, saxophonist Bruno Hedman and bassist Mohammed Hajelamin.

In 1993, the AfroNubians toured western Canada, and in 1994 released their first album, Tour to Africa. In 1995, they released the album The Great Africans and were named Band of the Year at the Toronto African Music Awards. That was followed by three tours across Canada and, in 1997, the Toronto Arts Council released their third album, Hobey Laik.

In 1998, shortly before the band was scheduled to embark on its first U.S. tour, Abubakar took a trip to Sudan and was killed in a motor vehicle accident.

In 2005, the Canadian Broadcasting Corporation released a CD, produced by Todd Fraracci, of two of the band's live concerts. Musicians included on the CD with Abubakar, Solomon, and Szilagy were Bruno Hedman (saxophone), Jim Heineman (saxophone and flute), Pa Jo (lead guitar), Altaf Bwana Moto (drums) and Joseph Ashong (percussion).

Discography
 1994: Tour to Africa
 1995: The Great Africans
 1997: Hobey Laik
 2005: Tarig Abubakar & Afronubians Live

References

External links
"Tarig Ahmed Abubakar: He was my friend", obituary by Opiyo Oloya
Afropop Worldwide: AfroNubians
CBC Shop: Tarig Abubakar & Afronubians Live (with band background)

Musical groups established in 1992
Musical groups disestablished in 1998
Musical groups from Toronto
Canadian world music groups
1992 establishments in Ontario
1998 disestablishments in Ontario